Samuel Reynolds may refer to:

Samuel F. Reynolds (died 1877), Los Angeles City Attorney and judge
Samuel Harvey Reynolds (1831–1897), divine and journalist
Samuel W. Reynolds (1890–1988), U.S. Senator
Samuel William Reynolds (1773–1835), painter and engraver
Samuel William Reynolds Jr. (1794–1872), son of above, portrait painter

See also
Samuel Reynolds Hole, Dean of Rochester Cathedral